Plugg may refer to:

Plugg (music), a subgenre of trap music
Plugg (film), a 1975 Australian comedy film

See also
Plug (disambiguation)